Maggott (Japheth) is a fictional superhero appearing in American comic books published by Marvel Comics. The character was briefly a member of the X-Men.

A flamboyant South African mutant who spoke in exaggerated Afrikaans slang, Maggott was advertised as one of the strangest X-Men. His digestive system took the form of two slugs which could eat through practically any substance. After feeding, the slugs reentered Maggott's abdomen and passed nourishment into him, giving him incredible power.

Publication history
Created by writer Scott Lobdell and Joe Madureira, he first appeared in Uncanny X-Men #345 (June 1997).

Fictional character biography
Maggott was first seen as a mysterious mutant who is searching out the X-Men’s adversary Magneto for an unknown reason. His search led to Antarctica where Magneto was holding the X-Men captive. Maggott then joined up with the team and returned with them to their Westchester, New York headquarters.

For a short period of time, Maggott believed his companions were going off on their own and killing innocent people. He even tried to turn himself over to the police before being stopped by the X-Men. His companions turned out to be innocent, as the people had been slain by a faction of N'Garai, though they hated to be called so. These entities are a demonic-type race that the X-Men had faced many times, mainly because a regenerating magical portal lies deep in the woods on the mansion's grounds. A matter which was never resolved was why Maggott's slugs were seemingly related to the N'Garai.

Maggott later was tempted by the entity Shadow King with promises of a better life in exchange for his loyalty and abandonment of the X-Men. He managed to resist the villain. Marrow and Cecilia Reyes were also propositioned by the King, but also resisted. Psylocke then rescues the X-Men after keeping Shadow King in a psionic prison, which forced her in retirement as she could not use her mind powers for anything or else the Shadow King would be released from the prison within Psylocke's mind.

At first, he kept his past to himself, but Maggott eventually revealed his origin to Wolverine. Maggott had been born a sickly child in Apartheid-era South Africa and was named Japheth. He was always very ill and he could not digest solid food. Feeling himself to be a burden on his family, he ran away from home with his younger brother. Having left home, hoping to die, he was found by Magneto who released the slugs from his body and revealed to Japheth his mutant power. This turned his skin blue for the first time, and he named the slugs Eany and Meany. Compassionate at heart, Japheth immediately rejected Magneto's philosophy and his offer to join him after he shortly witnessed later the Master of Magnetism brutally massacre numerous white South African soldiers who were engaged in racist atrocities against black South African civilians (despite the fact that one of these civilians was Japheth's eldest brother who died in the violence). In spite of this, he later sought out Magneto when he got older, for help in easing the pain caused by his unique mutation. After the then-current roster of the team parted ways, the X-Man Beast suggested Maggott transfer to the junior team Generation X, but his tenure there lasted only one issue and afterwards he fell out of sight. 

Maggott reappeared as an inmate at "Neverland," a concentration camp run by the covert government program Weapon X. Along with a number of other mutants, he was exterminated there.

One of his slugs, which he gave away to two children at the camp after foreseeing his death (thanks to his psychometric powers) at the camp, was last seen in a container in Mister Sinister's laboratory.

Maggott is later resurrected by means of the Transmode Virus to serve as part of Selene's army of deceased mutants. Under the control of Selene and Eli Bard, he takes part in the assault on the mutant nation of Utopia. Maggott's fate is uncertain as it is unknown if he was among the mutants teleported to Genosha by Blink to serve as a sacrifice to the newly-deitious Selene or if he was among the mutants that managed to escape Utopia.

Maggott was confirmed to still be alive and powered (though with only one of his slugs) as he was a guest at a superheroes and supervillains-themed costume party of New York branch of the Hellfire Club and was later apparently passed out drunk with other party guests (such as Rocket Raccoon) around an outdoor swimming pool. 

Maggott appeared (along with both of his slugs) along with the other X-Men as part of Cyclops' Million Mutant March in Washington D.C.

Most recently, Maggott briefly appeared during the X-Men Disassembled storyline as part of the last ditch battle against Nate Grey. Eventually returning to the primary Marvel Universe he and many others left behind while living separate lives in the Age of X-Man universe.

After the proclamation set up by X was telepathically broadcast to the whole world, Japheth was one amongst thousands to accept the invitation to the new mutant nation of Krakoa. He was later seen enjoying wine & revelry on his new homeland with a great many others among the revived mutant flock.

During the "Judgment Day" storyline, Maggott was among the mutants that were hunted by Kraven the Hunter.

Powers and abilities
 Digestive system replaced by a hollow cavity that houses a pair of semi-sentient slugs called Eany and Meany who bore their way out of his torso and then use powerful enzymes to process and digest any solid objects in their path at super speeds, transmitting food energy back to their host to supercharge his physical size, strength, stamina, and sturdiness while turning his skin blue and his eyes red, but the slugs must re-enter through his belly and release their storage internally to feed his body properly.
 Psychometric power enables him to draw psychic imprints from his environment, replaying in his mind's-eye events which once took place or will soon take place in his general vicinity.

Reception
 In 2014, Entertainment Weekly ranked Maggott 100th in their "Let's rank every X-Man ever" list.

Other versions

Age of X
In the Age of X alternate reality, Maggott was shown as a prisoner of the prison camp called Camp Gorge. He was killed by that reality's Iron Man.{

Ultimate Marvel
In the Ultimate Marvel universe, a version of Maggott made a cameo as a teenage mutant in Manhattan, killed by Mister Sinister acting on orders from Apocalypse. An alternate, child version of Maggott later appears in the Morlock tunnels underneath New York. He and his slug (named Joshua) seek out Kitty Pryde and her resistance cell after Jimmy Hudson is injured by Reverend Stryker's forces.

Battleworld X-Tinction Agenda
Japheth is one amongst many citizens of the X-Topia Province governed by God Emperor Doom selected baroness Rachel Grey. He was present when Havok and his Jenoshan's invaded X-City to kidnap one of Ms. Grey's people but not on scene during the battle between rival X factions. Maggott would attend the meeting wherein Rachel addressed her intent to invade Genosha to get her people back, but again he did not participate in the Melee that followed.

Age of X-Man
In the new human free dimension created by Nate Grey, Maggott is a disciple of En Sabah Nur. He helped Anole blow up the Hope Summers Library.

References

External links
 Maggott on the Marvel Universe
 Maggott at UncannyXmen.net
 Maggott at World of Black Heroes

Characters created by Joe Madureira
Characters created by Scott Lobdell
Comics characters introduced in 1997
Fictional South African people
Marvel Comics male superheroes
Marvel Comics mutants
Marvel Comics characters who have mental powers
Marvel Comics telepaths
X-Men members